Metarctia inconspicua is a moth of the subfamily Arctiinae. It was described by William Jacob Holland in 1892. It is found in Angola, Cameroon, the Republic of the Congo, the Democratic Republic of the Congo, Ghana, Ivory Coast, Kenya, South Sudan and Tanzania.

References

 

Metarctia
Moths described in 1892